FCIC or F.C.I.C. may refer to:
Federal Crop Insurance Corporation
Federal Citizen Information Center
Fellow of the Chemical Institute of Canada
Financial Crisis Inquiry Commission
Franciscan College of the Immaculate Conception, in the Philippines